Nehalem Bay State Airport  is a public airport located two miles (3.2 km) southeast of Manzanita in Tillamook County, Oregon, United States.

The airport is located within the boundaries of Nehalem Bay State Park. It also offers several campsites for fly-in camping, just a few steps away from the tiedown area. About a ten-minute walk to the north is the town of Manzanita, offering dining and lodging.

See also
Nehalem Bay

External links

Airports in Tillamook County, Oregon